Baltazar Nicolai Garben (19 February 1794 – 21 April 1867) was a Norwegian military officer,  engineer and government minister. He is most associated with the design and construction of various buildings including Tøyhuset (now Fredriksten Kro) at Halden, Norway.

Biography
Garben was born at Sparbu  in Nord-Trøndelag, Norway. He was a career military officer in the Norwegian Armed Forces and was trained in engineering. He was an officer from 1810, Colonel and Chief of the Norwegian Engineering Brigade from 1851 and General Major from 1851. Garben was responsible for the design of various military buildings at  Fredriksten Fortress in Halden and at the Citadellet at Horten.

Garben served in the administration of Prime Minister Frederik Due as an interim  member of the  Norwegian Council of State Division in Stockholm during 1852, 1852–1853 and 1857 .

Gallery

References

External links
Fredriksten Kro

1794 births
1867 deaths
People from Nord-Trøndelag
Norwegian military engineers
Norwegian civil engineers
Norwegian Army generals
Government ministers of Norway
Recipients of the Order of the Sword
Recipients of the St. Olav's Medal